Gbogolo is a village in western Ivory Coast. It is in the sub-prefecture of Massala, Séguéla Department, Worodougou Region, Woroba District.

Gbogolo was a commune until March 2012, when it became one of 1126 communes nationwide that were abolished.

Notes

Former communes of Ivory Coast
Populated places in Woroba District
Populated places in Worodougou